Zhang Xinjun (born 10 June 1987) is a Chinese professional golfer who currently plays on PGA Tour. He won twice on the Korn Ferry Tour in 2019 when he topped the regular season points list. In 2017, along with Dou Zecheng, he was one of the first Chinese players to gain their card on the PGA Tour.

Amateur career
Zhang represented China at the 2010 Asian Games.

Professional career
Zhang turned professional in 2010. Having won on the PGA Tour China in 2014 he qualified to join the second tier Web.com Tour in 2015 after finishing second on the Order of Merit. However, towards the end of the season he was banned for six months after having been found guilty of signing for incorrect scores on two occasions, and ultimately stayed in China for another season. The following year he won again and finished third on the Order of Merit to again earn his place on the Web.com Tour for 2016.

Having found limited opportunities on the Web.com Tour in 2016, Zhang again returned to China. He finished 5th on the Order of Merit to earn a return to the Web.com Tour. He played in all regular season tournaments and finished 20th on the Web.com Tour points list in 2017 to graduate to the PGA Tour for 2018. He did not manage to win enough points to retain his place on the PGA Tour during his rookie season and dropped back to the second tier for 2019.

Zhang claimed two victories on the now renamed Korn Ferry Tour in 2019, at the Dormie Network Classic and the Lincoln Land Championship, and finished the season on top of the regular season points list to regain his card on the PGA Tour for the 2019–20 season.

Professional wins (6)

Korn Ferry Tour wins (2)

Korn Ferry Tour playoff record (1–0)

China Tour wins (3)

Other wins (1)
 2012 China Tour Final

Results in major championships
Results not in chronological order in 2020.

CUT = missed the halfway cut
 
NT = No tournament due to COVID-19 pandemic

Results in The Players Championship

CUT = missed the halfway cut

Results in World Golf Championships
Results not in chronological order before 2015.

"T" = tied

Team appearances
Professional
World Cup (representing China): 2011

See also
2017 Web.com Tour Finals graduates
2019 Korn Ferry Tour Finals graduates

References

External links

Zhang Xinjun at the China Tour official site

Chinese male golfers
PGA Tour golfers
Sportspeople from Shanxi
Sportspeople from Guangdong
1987 births
Living people
20th-century Chinese people
21st-century Chinese people